Wushu at the 2018 Asian Games was held at the Jakarta International Expo, Jakarta, Indonesia, from 19 to 23 August 2018.

Schedule

Medalists

Men's taolu

Men's sanda

Women's taolu

Women's sanda

Medal table

Participating nations
A total of 201 athletes from 27 nations competed in wushu at the 2018 Asian Games:

References

External links
Wushu at the 2018 Asian Games
Taolu Results
Sanda Results
Official Result Book – Wushu

 
2018 Asian Games events
2018
Asian Games